The 2014 European Athletics Championships was held in Zürich, Switzerland, between 12 and 17 August 2014. It was the first time that Switzerland had hosted the European Athletics Championships since 1954.

Great Britain headed the medal table, with 12 gold medals, comfortably their best return from a European championships, despite winning only one field event medal. France, second on gold medals won with 9, won the most medals, 25.

Event schedule

Results

Men

Track

(*) Heat only.

 In the 3000m steeplechase, Mahiedine Mekhissi-Benabbad of France won the race, but he was later disqualified after he took off his shirt while running down the home straight. Yoann Kowal (France) was then awarded gold, Krystian Zalewski (Poland) silver and Angel Mullera (Spain) bronze.

Field

Women

Track

(*) Heat only.

Field

Medal table

Participating nations
Athletes from a total of 50 member federations of the European Athletics Association are competing at these Championships.

 (host)

See also
 List of stripped European Athletics Championships medals
 2014 African Championships in Athletics

References

External links

 Official website

 
European Athletics Championships
International athletics competitions hosted by Switzerland
Athletics Championships
European Athletics Championships
Sports competitions in Zürich
European
21st century in Zürich
August 2014 sports events in Europe